The 1998–99 Kent Football League season was the 33rd in the history of Kent Football League a football competition in England.

League table

The league featured 19 clubs which competed in the previous season, no new clubs joined the league this season.

League table

References

External links

1998-99
1998–99 in English football leagues